Jason Harris Katz is an American voice actor and a former television host. He was the host of the short-lived Double Dare 2000 on Nickelodeon. He also was a host of Nickelodeon's Big Help on the Road in the late 1990s. He appeared on Codename: Kids Next Door voicing the character Chad Dickson/Numbuh 274 and in a commercial for Olive Garden. In 2002, Harris voiced Bill Dickey in the failed Adult Swim pilot, Welcome to Eltingville. He also did several minor voices in the video game Destroy All Humans! 2, and he played Top Cat from 2011 to 2015.

Since 2003, he has been married to actress Peter Pamela Rose. He had a voice-acting role in Turok as Carter and starred in the movie, Top Cat: The Movie, as the English dub voices of Top Cat, Choo-Choo, Brain, Griswald, Strickland and Big Gus.

Filmography

References

External links

American game show hosts
American male voice actors
Living people
People from Manhattan
Year of birth missing (living people)